A pager is a telecommunications device similar to a beeper, SMS client, or email appliance.

Pager may also refer to:

Computers
 Pager (GUI), the graphical user interface feature
 Terminal pager, a computer program used to view the contents of a text file

People
 Antal Páger (actor) (1899–1986), Hungarian actor
 Devah Pager (1972–2018), American sociologist
 Antal Páger (canoeist), Hungarian canoer

Other uses
 PAGER (Prompt Assessment of Global Earthquakes for Response), an earthquake monitoring system run by the US Geological Survey
 "The Pager", an episode of the American series The Wire
 Pager (company), an American mobile healthcare technology company
 Pager Publications, Inc., an American medical education literary organization
 Pager River, the river in northern Uganda

See also
 Page (disambiguation)
 Paging, a computer memory management scheme